Storm Surfers 3D is an Australian documentary film, directed by Justin McMillan and Christopher Nelius and released in 2012. Narrated by Toni Collette, the film centres on Ross Clarke-Jones and Tom Carroll, two Australian surfers who specialize in tow-in surfing.

The film had its Australian theatrical premiere in August 2012. It was screened in September at the 2012 Toronto International Film Festival, where it was named first runner-up for the People's Choice Award for Documentaries.

It subsequently won the AACTA Award for Best Feature Length Documentary at the 2nd AACTA Awards in 2013. It was also nominated in the AACTA award categories for Best Editing in a Documentary and Best Cinematography in a Documentary.

References

External links
 

2012 films
Documentary films about surfing
Australian surfing films
Australian 3D films
2010s English-language films
Australian sports documentary films